Aluwihare is a village in Sri Lanka. It is located within Central Province and is famous because of Aluvihare Rock Temple.

See also
List of towns in Central Province, Sri Lanka

References

External links

Populated places in Matale District